In enzymology, a creatinine deaminase is an enzyme that catalyzes the chemical reaction

creatinine + H2O  N-methylhydantoin + NH3

Thus, the two substrates of this enzyme are creatinine and H2O, whereas its two products are N-methylhydantoin and NH3.

This enzyme belongs to the family of hydrolases, those acting on carbon-nitrogen bonds other than peptide bonds, specifically in cyclic amidines.  The systematic name of this enzyme class is creatinine iminohydrolase. Other names in common use include creatinine hydrolase, and creatinine desiminase.  This enzyme participates in arginine and proline metabolism.

References 

 

EC 3.5.4
Enzymes of unknown structure